The Iran–United States Claims Tribunal (IUSCT) is an international arbitral tribunal established by the Algiers Accords, an international agreement between the U.S. and Iran embodied in two Declarations by the Government of the Democratic and Popular Republic of Algeria  issued on 19 January 1981, to resolve the Iran Hostage Crisis created by the seizure of the U.S. Embassy in Tehran on November 4, 1979.

The Khomeini regime held 52 American diplomats hostage for 444 days. In response, the United States froze billions of dollars of Iranian assets, imposed sweeping sanctions on transactions with Iran, and authorized judicial attachment of Iranian assets in the United States. The settlement with Iran, mediated by senior Algerian officials, called for the release of the American hostages, termination of litigation against Iran in U.S. courts, return of frozen assets, payment of outstanding bank loans, and settlement of outstanding property and contract claims of U.S. nationals by a new tribunal seated in The Hague, Netherlands. See Mark B. Feldman Oral History pp. 106, 109, 113, Foreign Affairs Oral History Collection, Association for Diplomatic Studies and Training, Mark Feldman.pdf

The IUSCT has been called "the most significant arbitral body in history", and its decisions are considered influential in the areas of investor-state arbitration and state responsibility.

History

Both Iran and the U.S. adhered to the final accord. U.S. President Ronald Reagan, who took office the day after the Algiers Accords, affirmed the agreement, and the U.S. Supreme Court upheld its constitutionality in Dames & Moore v. Regan.  The Tribunal held its first meeting in the Peace Palace on July 1, 1981, moving to its own premises in The Hague the following year.
The Tribunal closed to new claims by private individuals on 19 January 1982, one year after it was established. It received over 4,700 claims and ordered payments totaling over US$3.5 billion; around US$2.5 billion by Iran to U.S. nationals and more than US$1 billion by the U.S. to Iran.  

, all private claims had been resolved, while several intergovernmental claims are still pending.

Jurisdiction and procedure
The Tribunal consists of nine members, three appointed by Iran, three by the U.S., and three from third-party countries that are appointed by the other six members. Claims are decided by one of the three Chambers of the Tribunal or by the Full Tribunal if it concerns disputes between the two governments or important questions referred to it by the Chambers. The Tribunal operates largely in accordance with the arbitration rules of the United Nations Commission on International Trade Law (UNCITRAL), albeit with some modifications.
Pursuant to the Claims Agreement, the Tribunal has jurisdiction to decide:

 Claims of U.S. nationals against Iran and of Iranian nationals against the U.S. that arise from debts, contracts, and other measures affecting property rights; 
 Certain "official claims" between the U.S. and Iranian governments relating to the purchase and sale of goods and services;
 Disputes between Iran and the U.S. concerning the interpretation or performance of the Algiers Declarations.

Personnel

Judges
 Charles N. Brower
 Mohsen Aghahosseini
 Rosemary Barkett
 David D. Caron

Third-country arbitrators
 Herbert Kronke
 Bruno Simma
 Kamal Hossain
 Krzysztof Skubiszewski

References

Further reading
 American Hostages In Iran: The Conduct of a Crisis (Yale 1985)
 Revolutionary Days: The Iran Hostage Crisis and the Hague Claims Tribunal, A Look Back (Juris 1996)
 Mark B. Feldman, Foreign Affairs Oral History Collection, Association for Diplomatic Studies and Training, https://adst.org/OH%20TOCs/Feldman.Mark.pdf
 Symposium on the Settlement with Iran, March 6–7, 1981, Lawyer of the Americas, U Miami J. Int'l Law (Special Issue, Spring 1981).

External links
 

Iran–United States relations
International arbitration courts and tribunals
Organisations based in The Hague